Four referendums were held in Switzerland during 1935. The first was held on 24 February on a federal law reorganising the military, and was approved by voters. The second was held on 5 May on a federal law on the transport of goods and animals on roads, and was rejected by two-thirds of voters. The third was held on 2 June on a popular initiative "to combat the economic crisis" and was also rejected by voters. The fourth was held on 8 September on a popular initiative "for a total revision of the federal constitution", and was rejected by 72% of voters.

Background
The June referendum on the popular initiative "to combat the economic crisis" was a mandatory referendum, requiring a double majority; a majority of the popular vote and majority of the cantons. The decision of each canton was based on the vote in that canton. Full cantons counted as one vote, whilst half cantons counted as half. The  February and March referendums were "optional", whilst the September referendum was a "process initiating decision", both of which required only a majority of the public vote.

Results

February: Reorganisation of the military

May: Transport of goods and animals

June: Combating the economic crisis

September: Total revision of the constitution

References

1935 referendums
1935 in Switzerland
Referendums in Switzerland